Nino Marchetti (21 February 1905 – 19 February 1981) was an Italian film actor. He appeared in 66 films between 1934 and 1973.

Selected filmography

 Melodramma (1934) - Remo
 Le scarpe al sole (1935) - Alpino amico di Toni i Cesco
 Lo squadrone bianco (1936) - Il sodato addetto segretario del capitano Santelia (uncredited)
 The Great Appeal (1936) - Il chirurgo
 Condottieri (1937) - Corrado
 Tonight at Eleven (1938) - Il direttore del cinema
 Ballerine (1938)
 Giuseppe Verdi (1938) - Un amico di verdi a Buseto
 Department Store (1939) - L'ispettore dell'inchiesta (uncredited)
 Dora Nelson (1939) - Il produttore
 Il ponte dei sospiri (1940)
 La granduchessa si diverte (1940)
 The Siege of the Alcazar (1940) - Fernando Ramirez
 Abandonment (1940)
 La danza dei milioni (1940) - Segretario di Walter
 Piccolo alpino (1940) - Rossi
 Non me lo dire! (1940) - L'impiegato del negozio
 The Daughter of the Green Pirate (1940) - Ramon
 Lucky Night (1941)
 Marco Visconti (1941)
 Piccolo mondo antico (1941) - Pedraglio, il cospiratore
 Light in the Darkness (1941) - L'impresario musicale
 Beatrice Cenci (1941) - Un contadino della Petrella
 La pantera nera (1942) - Gerard
 Mater dolorosa (1943)
 The Lovers (1946)
 The White Devil (1947) - Captain Peter
 Les Misérables (1948)
 Tempesta su Parigi (1948)
 Guarany (1948)
 Arrivederci, papà! (1948)
 The Emperor of Capri (1949) - Geremia
 Ring Around the Clock (1950) - Giulio
 L'inafferrabile 12 (1950)
 Song of Spring (1950)
 Anna (1951) - L'infermiere di guardia (uncredited)
 The Overcoat (1952)
 Toto and the King of Rome (1952) - Tavago
 Brothers of Italy (1952) - Il comandante Pullino
 La trappola di fuoco (1952) - The priest
 Il viale della speranza (1953) - Executive at 'Olmo Film'
 Riscatto (1953)
 The Pagans (1953) - Colonel Avilano
 The Treasure of Bengal (1953)
 Avanzi di galera (1954)
 The River Girl (1954) - Maresciallo dei carabinieri
 La campana di San Giusto (1954)
 Orphan of the Ghetto (1954)
 Foglio di via (1954)
 Le avventure di Cartouche (1955) - Tiranno
 Roland the Mighty (1955)
 Il prezzo della gloria (1956) - padre di Ruggero
 Fathers and Sons (1957) - Man at the Driving Lesson (uncredited)
 The Lady Doctor (1957) - (uncredited)
 Il cielo brucia (1958)
 Il romanzo di un giovane povero (1958)
 Big Deal on Madonna Street (1958) - Luigi
 Valeria ragazza poco seria (1958) - Poliziotto
 La sposa (1958) - Il medico
 Herod the Great (1959)
 Hercules Unchained (1959) - Fossore (uncredited)
 Prisoner of the Volga (1959) - Michailow
 Desert Desperados (1959) - Metullus
 La cento chilometri (1959) - Corsetti's Friend with a Dark Suit
 The Cossacks (1960) - Russian Officer
 Lipstick (1960) - Agente di polizia
 The Pharaohs' Woman (1960)
 The Bacchantes (1961) - Theban Citizen (uncredited)
 Blood Feud (1961)
 Gioventù di notte (1961) - Collega Padre di Marco
 The Centurion (1961)
 The Trojan Horse (1961)
 Le magnifiche 7 (1961)
 Toto vs. Maciste (1962) - Gran Dignitario
 A Queen for Caesar (1962) - Messaggero di Pompeius
 Queste pazze pazze donne (1964) - Customer from Bologna ('Siciliani a Milano")
 The Triumph of Hercules (1964) - Thieves' Victim
 Samson and His Mighty Challenge (1964)
 I due pericoli pubblici (1964) - Marshal (uncredited)
 Latin Lovers (1965) - Riccardo (segment "Il telefono consolatore")
 Spiaggia libera (1966)
 Sex Quartet (1965) - The Guest (segment "Fata Marta")
 Non Pensare a Me (1967)
 I criminali della metropoli (1967)
 God Will Forgive My Pistol (1969) - Clock Merchant
 I 2 magnifici fresconi (1969) - Customer from Bologna (uncredited)
 Reverend's Colt (1970) - Deputy Hop
 La ragazza del prete (1970)
 Un burattino di nome Pinocchio (1971) - The Police Officer (voice)
 Le mille e una notte... e un'altra ancora! (1973)

References

External links

1905 births
1981 deaths
Italian male film actors
20th-century Italian male actors